Miroslav Kenanov; born April 20, 1988, in Samokov) is a Bulgarian biathlete.

Kenanov competed in the 2010 Winter Olympics for Bulgaria. His best performance was 16th, as part of the Bulgarian relay team. He also finished 82nd in the sprint.

As of February 2013, his best performance at the Biathlon World Championships, is 9th, as part of the 2013 Bulgarian men's relay team. His best individual performance is 61st, in the 2012 sprint.

As of February 2013, his best Biathlon World Cup finish is 11th, as part of the Bulgarian men's relay team at Hochfilzen during the 2010/11 season. His best individual finish is 49th, in the sprint at Hochfilzen in 2011/12.

As of February 2014, his best performance at the Olympic games is 75th in the men's 20 km individual sprint at Sochi . This is his best finish at the Olympic winter games in his career.

References 

1988 births
Biathletes at the 2010 Winter Olympics
Biathletes at the 2014 Winter Olympics
Bulgarian male biathletes
Living people
Olympic biathletes of Bulgaria
People from Samokov
Sportspeople from Sofia Province
20th-century Bulgarian people
21st-century Bulgarian people